Yeniyurt  is a village in Erdemli district of Mersin Province, Turkey. At  it is  situated in the peneplane area of the Taurus Mountains. The population of Yeniyurt was 255 as of 2012. The area around the village is full of Roman ruins including a castle and two bridges still used by the pedestrians. But the village was founded during the Ottoman era. It was originally a part of Veyselli village. But it 1933 it was issued from Veyselli and was declared a village. Main economic activity is farming. Tomato and various other vegetables and fruits are produced.

See also
Yeniyurt castle

References

Villages in Erdemli District